Le Destin fabuleux de Désirée Clary (Mlle. Desiree) is a French film released in September 1942, black and white, written and directed by Sacha Guitry. The film concerns the life of Désirée Clary, the daughter of a Marseilles merchant, who became Queen of Sweden and the founder of a dynasty.

Plot
Julie and Désirée Clary are courted by the brothers Joseph and Napoleon Bonaparte. Joseph marries Julie and  Napoleon is affianced to Désirée. When Napoleon breaks the engagement and marries Joséphine de Beauharnais, Désirée becomes involved with General Bernadotte.

Cast 
 Sacha Guitry as Narrator 
 Jean-Louis Barrault as Napoléon Bonaparte
 Aimé Clariond as Joseph Bonaparte
 Jacques Varennes as Jean-Baptiste Bernadotte, then Charles XIV John of Sweden
 Geneviève Guitry as Désirée Clary, as a young woman
 Gaby Morlay as Désirée Clary 
 Lise Delamare as Joséphine de Beauharnais
 Yvette Lebon as Julie Clary
 Camille Fournier as Julie Bonaparte
 Georges Grey as Junot
 Jean Hervé as Talma
 Jeanne Fusier-Gir as Albertine, servant
 Germaine Laugier as Madame Clary 
 Pierre Magnier as Monsieur Clary 
 Jean Périer as Talleyrand
 Noël Roquevert as Fouché
 Maurice Teynac as Marmont
 Jean Darcante as Duphot
 Jean Davy as Berthier
 Georges Spanelly as Davout
 Georges Tourreil as Cambronne
 Renaud Mary as le docteur Antommarchi
 Maurice Lagrenée as Duke of Richelieu
 Roger Vincent as Charles XIII of Sweden
 Gaston Mauger as Louis XVIII of France

References

External links 
 

1942 films
1940s historical drama films
French historical drama films
Films directed by Sacha Guitry
Films about Napoleon
Films set in the 1800s
Biographical films about Swedish royalty
Cultural depictions of Joséphine de Beauharnais
Cultural depictions of Charles Maurice de Talleyrand-Périgord
1942 drama films
1940s French-language films
Cultural depictions of Charles XIV John
1940s French films